Kazemi (also Romanized as Kāz̧emī; also known as Tīzāb-e Kāz̧emī and  Kāẓemābād) is a village in Mirbag-e Jonubi Rural District, in the Central District of Delfan County, Lorestan Province, Iran. At the 2006 census, its population was 127, in 26 families.

References 

Towns and villages in Delfan County